The British Journal of Photography (BJP) is a magazine about photography, published by 1854 Media. It includes in-depth articles, profiles of photographers, analyses, and technological reviews.

History
The magazine was established in Liverpool as the Liverpool Photographic Journal in 1854 with its first issue appearing on 14 January 1854, making it the United Kingdom's second oldest photographic title after the Photographic Journal. It was printed monthly until 1857 when it became the Liverpool and Manchester Photographic Journal, published bi-weekly, then the Photographic Journal from 1859 to 1860, when it obtained its present name. The magazine moved to London in 1864, first to Covent Garden; then in 2007 to Soho; and in 2013 to Shoreditch; then in 2017 to East India Dock. It was published weekly from 1864 to March 2010, then reverted to its original monthly period. It is now also available as an electronic magazine, online and in iPad and iPhone formats.

In 2013, Incisive Media sold the British Journal of Photography to its publishing director, who formed Apptitude Media. In 2017 Apptitude Media was rebranded as 1854 Media.

In 2022 Marc Hartog left as owner, CEO and chairman of 1854 Media, and the magazine's Creative Director Mick Moore took over as CEO.

Editors
The following persons have been editor-in-chief of the magazine:

Liverpool Photographic Journal
 1854–55: Charles Corey
 1855–56: Frank Howard
 1857–58: G. R. Berry

Liverpool & Manchester Photographic Journal
 January 1858 – May 1858: William Crookes
 June 1857 – February 1858: T. A. Malone

Liverpool & Manchester Photographic Journal, Photographic Journal and British Journal of Photography
 March 1858–June 1864: George Shadbolt

British Journal of Photography
 July 1864 – December 1878: J. Traill Taylor and others
 January 1879 – December 1885: W. B. Bolton
 January 1886 – November 1895: James Traill Taylor
 November 1895 – ?: Thomas Bedding
 1911: George E. Brown
 1937–67: Arthur James Dalladay
 1967–87: Geoffrey Crawley
 1987–92: Chris Dickie (Christopher Gordon Dickie, 26 September 1951 – 8 June 2011)
 1993–99: Reuel Golden
 1999–2000: Chris Dickie
 2000 – August 2003: John Tarrant
 August 2003 – September 2003: Chris Dickie
 October 2003 – August 2020: Simon Bainbridge
 December 2020 – present: Izabela Radwanska Zhang

Awards organised by BJP

Female in Focus 
2020 Winners

Dimpy Bhalotia, Kasia Trojak, Ana Nance, Carmen Daneshmandi, Yuet Yee Wong, Nicole Benewaah Gehle,

2019 Winners

Nancy Newberry, Sarah Pannell, Gwendolyn Keasberry, Charlotte Bergan, Sarah Blais, Fern Berresford

International Photography Award 

An annual award.

Breakthrough

An award for students and recent graduates.

Portrait of Britain

Portrait of Britain is an annual British pay-to-enter portrait photography competition run by the British Journal of Photography. Its subject is the diversity of British people. The 100 winning portraits are displayed on JCDecaux's digital screens across Britain throughout September. It launched in 2016.

References

External links
 
 EdinPhoto: The British Journal of Photography
 The British Journal of Photography, Vol. X (1863)
 The British Journal of Photography, Vol. XXVII (1880)
 The British Journal of Photography, Vol. LVIII (1911)

1854 establishments in the United Kingdom
Visual arts magazines published in the United Kingdom
Monthly magazines published in the United Kingdom
Magazines established in 1854
Photography in the United Kingdom
Photography magazines
International awards
Photography awards
International art awards